

Belgium
 Belgian Congo – Théophile Wahis, Governor-General of the Belgian Congo (1908–1912)

France
 French India –
 Adrien Jules Jean Bonhoure, Governor-General of Pondicherry (1908–1909)
 Ernest Fernand Lévecque, Governor-General of Pondicherry (1909–1910)
 French Polynesia – Joseph Pascal François, Governor General of French Polynesia (1908–1910)
 French Somaliland –
 Jean-Baptiste Castaing, acting Governor of French Somaliland (1908–1909)
 Pierre Hubert Auguste Pascal, Governor of French Somaliland (1909–1911)
 Guinea – Victor Théophile Liotard, Lieutenant-Governor of Guinea (1908–1910)

Japan
 Karafuto – Hiraoka Teitarō, Governor-General of Karafuto (12 June 1908 – 5 June 1914)
 Korea –
Itō Hirobumi, Resident-General (1905–1909)
Sone Arasuke, Resident-General (1909)
Terauchi Masatake, Resident-General (1909–1910)
 Taiwan – Sakuma Samata, Governor-General of Taiwan (15 April 1906 – May 1915)

Portugal
 Angola –
 Henrique Mitchell de Paiva, Governor-General of Angola (1907–1909)
 Álvaro António da Costa Ferreira, Governor-General of Angola (1909)
 José Augusto Alves Roçadas, Governor-General of Angola (1909–1910)

United Kingdom
 Barotziland-North-Western Rhodesia
 Position temporarily vacant (December 1908-January 1909)
 Lawrence Aubrey Wallace, Administrator of Barotziland-North-Western Rhodesia (1909–1911)
 Malta Colony
Henry Grant, Governor of Malta (1907–1909)
Leslie Rundle, Governor of Malta (1909–1915)
 North-Eastern Rhodesia
 Lawrence Aubrey Wallace, Administrator of North-Eastern Rhodesia (1907–1909)
 Leicester Paul Beaufort, Administrator of North-Eastern Rhodesia (1909–1911)
 Straits Settlement – John Anderson, Governor of the Staits Settlement (1904–1911)

United States
 Hawaii - Walter F. Frear (1907–1913), Territorial Governor of Hawaii

Colonial governors
Colonial governors
1909